Merab Dzodzuashvili (born 4 November 1980) is a Georgian football player who is currently playing for Greek club Asteria Drapetsona.

References

1980 births
Living people
Place of birth missing (living people)
Footballers from Georgia (country)
Association football midfielders
FC Lokomotivi Tbilisi players
FC Guria Lanchkhuti players
FC Samgurali Tskaltubo players
FC Dila Gori players
FC Kolkheti-1913 Poti players
FC Baku players
FC Torpedo Kutaisi players
Erovnuli Liga players
Azerbaijan Premier League players
Georgia (country) international footballers
Expatriate footballers from Georgia (country)
Expatriate sportspeople from Georgia (country) in Azerbaijan
Expatriate footballers in Azerbaijan